The Mexican South Pacific Coast mangroves ecoregion (WWF ID: NT1422) covers the mangrove sites along the coast of the Pacific Ocean coast of Mexico, across the states of Michoacán, Guerrero, and Oaxaca.  These mangrove forests are mostly around lagoons, typically those fed by rivers from the interior in the Sierra Madre del Sur Mountains.  The ecoregion is small: collectively, it covers only 1,295 km2.

Location and description
The ecoregion stretches across 1,000 km of the coast, primarily around the margins of river deltas and lagoons.  Major mangrove sites are found at:
 Lázaro Cárdenas, Michoacán, at the mouth of the Balsas River.  A RAMSAR wetland of international importance.  This are affected by the port of Lazaro Cardenas, the largest seaport in Mexico.
 Zihuatanejo, a city on the coast of Guerrero state,
 Barra de Potosí, a lagoon behind a small fishing village in the municipality of Petatlán
 San Luis de la Loma, a town on the coast in the municipality of Tecpán de Galeana
 Atoyac de Álvarez, a town behind two coastal lagoons in Guerrero state
 Puerto Marqués, 10 km south of Acapulco
 Papagayo River delta, and nearby lagoons
 Ometepec River delta and nearby lagoons
 Laguna de Corralero on the coast of the municipality of Pinotepa Nacional in Oaxaca
 Lagunas de Chacahua National Park, at the mouth of the Río Verde (Oaxaca)
 Lagoons north and south of Puerto Escondido, Oaxaca
 The coastal strip south of Salina Cruz

Climate
The climate of the ecoregion is Tropical savanna climate - dry winter (Köppen climate classification (Aw)).  This climate is characterized by relatively even temperatures throughout the year, and a pronounced dry season.  The driest month has less than 60 mm of precipitation, and is drier than the average month.

Flora and fauna
The characteristic trees species are red mangrove (Rhizophora mangle), white mangrove (Laguncularia racemosa), black mangrove (Avicennia germinans) and buttonwood (Conocarpus erectus). Aquatic plants in the lagoons include water hyacinth (Eichhornia).

Protected areas
Officially protected areas in the ecoregion include:
 Lagunas de Chacahua National Park

References

Neotropical ecoregions
Ecoregions of Mexico
Mangrove ecoregions
Tropical Eastern Pacific